Southfield may refer to:

 Southfield, Jamaica
 Southfield, Massachusetts, village within the town of New Marlborough
 SouthField, Massachusetts (development), planned community near Boston
 Southfield, Michigan
 Southfield, Staten Island, New York

See also 
 South Field (disambiguation)
 Southfields (disambiguation)
 Southfield School (disambiguation)